Chandra Pemmaraju is an Indian-American film writer and director.

Early life and career
Pemmaraju's interest in creative fields over the years has been expressed in the form of short plays that he wrote & directed while in India. A film enthusiast and strong desire to pursue movie making as a medium to create and express art has made him to take the plunge in 2008, switching from a financial services career in to filmmaking. Since then he had made short films, and independent films, that have been well received at various international film festivals in the United States and India.

He has written, produced, and directed May Beetle, Kissing Miss Jones and worked in the screenplay department, production management for the internationally acclaimed film Life! Camera Action... that won numerous awards and wide critical acclaim. He was also invited to curate a Bollywood Night in the New Filmmakers Festival in New York.

Filmography

Festivals & nominations

May Beetle (2008)
Premiered at the New Film Makers Film Festival, Anthology Archives in New York City
Kissing Miss Jones (2009)
Premiered at the New York Indian Film Festival 2009
New Film Makers Film Festival, New York
Indian International Film Festival of Tampa Bay 2010
Love Lies and Seeta (2012)
Official Selection at the NFDC Film Bazaar, International Film Festival of India 2011, Goa India
Closing Night Feature at the Indian International Film Festival of Tampa Bay 2012, Florida
Official Selection at the Spring Film Festival 2012 – New filmmakers 2012, New York City
Official Selection at the Riverside International Film Festival 2012, California
Honorary Mention Award at the Los Angeles New Wave International Film Fest 2011, USA
Official Selection at the Mumbai Film Mart, Mumbai Film Fest, India
Official Selection at the Art of Brooklyn Film Fest 2012, USA
Nominated for the Best Film, Best Direction, Best Actress & Actor in leading role at the World Music and Independent Film Festival, Washington DC 2012
Award of Excellence for Best Feature & Best Direction at the Indie Fest

References

External links

American film directors of Indian descent
American male screenwriters
Living people
Year of birth missing (living people)